Prime Minister's Lodge (also known as the Prime Minister's Cottage) is a country house in Nuwara Eliya, Sri Lanka. It is the vacationing and country residence of the Prime Minister of Sri Lanka. Located within the limits of the Nuwara Eliya Municipal Council along the Queen Elizabeth Drive, in close proximity to the Queen's Cottage. The property is administered by the Prime Minister's Office, while the grounds and garden are maintained by the Department of National Botanical Gardens  

On 23 February 2007 the building was formally recognised by the Government as an Archaeological Protected Monument.

See also
Queen's Cottage 
General's House, Nuwara Eliya

References

Archaeological protected monuments in Nuwara Eliya District
British colonial architecture in Sri Lanka
Country houses in Sri Lanka
Houses in Nuwara Eliya
Official residences in Sri Lanka